Mugnano di Napoli is a comune (municipality) in the Metropolitan City of Naples in the Italian region Campania, located about 10 km northwest of Naples. 
Mugnano di Napoli borders the following municipalities: Calvizzano, Giugliano in Campania, Marano di Napoli, Melito di Napoli, Naples, Villaricca.

Scuola Filippo Illuminato in Mugnano di Napoli is named in honour of Filippo Illuminato (1930-1943), partisan, Gold Medal of Military Valour.

References

External links
Official website 

Cities and towns in Campania